All People Will Be Brothers is a 1973 West German drama film directed by Alfred Vohrer and starring Harald Leipnitz, Doris Kunstmann and Rainer von Artenfels.

Cast
 Harald Leipnitz as Werner Mark
 Doris Kunstmann as Lillian
 Rainer von Artenfels as Richard Mark
 Klaus Schwarzkopf as Boris Minski
 Herbert Fleischmann as Kommissar Eilers
 Konrad Georg as Paradin
 Elisabeth Volkmann as Vanessa
 Christiane Maybach as Die Rote
 Ingrid van Bergen as Nachtclub-Sängerin
 Alf Marholm as Delacorte
 Manfred Seipold as Kriminalbeamter Olsen
 Heinz Baumann as William Carpenter
 Alfred Balthoff as Mendel
 Michel Jacot as Ted
 Alexander Golling as Bauer
 Edith Schultze-Westrum as Frau Schermoly
 Hilde Brand as Frau Schermolys Assistantin
 Ingeborg Lapsien as Rachel Minski
 Herta Worell as Mrs. Buttermark
 Achim Hammer as Dr. Hess
 Eduard Linkers as Mann mit Bart
 Hermann Lenschau as Professor Mohn
 Roberto Blanco as Tiny

References

Bibliography 
 Bock, Hans-Michael & Bergfelder, Tim. The Concise CineGraph. Encyclopedia of German Cinema. Berghahn Books, 2009.

External links 
 

1973 films
1973 drama films
German drama films
West German films
1970s German-language films
Films directed by Alfred Vohrer
Constantin Film films
Films about brothers
Films based on Austrian novels
1970s German films